Marquart and the variant spellings Marquard,  Marquardt, Markwardt, Markwart and Markwat is a surname. It may refer to:
Josef Markwart (1864–1930) also known as Josef Marquart, German historian and orientalist
Johannes Marquart (1909), German actuarial mathematician and cryptanalyst
Ludwig Clamor Marquart (1804–1881), German pharmacist and entrepreneur
Michael Marquart, American musician
Paul Marquart (born 1957), American politician
William Marquart (1915–1960), Canadian boxer